Bollklubben forward, commonly known as BK forward, is a football team from Örebro, Sweden. They play in Division 1 Norra. The club plays in a small multipurpose stadium called Trängens IP. The base of the club is in the western end of downtown, whereas the city's historically main club Örebro SK play in the eastern end. The club is affiliated to the Örebro Läns Fotbollförbund.

The club is well known for its youth system, having created players like Jimmy Durmaz, Jiloan Hamad and Jacob Rinne.

The club has also had some success playing bandy, playing in the top Swedish series in 1973/74.

Season to season

Attendances

In recent seasons BK Forward have had the following average attendances:

Achievements

League
 Division 1 Norra:
 Runners-up (1): 2012

References

External links
Official site

Football clubs in Örebro County
Sport in Örebro
Association football clubs established in 1934
Bandy clubs established in 1934
1934 establishments in Sweden